Şark Bülbülü is a 1979 Turkish comedy film directed by Kartal Tibet.

Cast 
 Kemal Sunal - Saban Ballises
 Ayşen Cansev - Hatice 
 Ayşen Gruda - Fethi'nin Kiz Kardesi
 Osman Alyanak - Haydar
  - Zülfo Aga
  - Fethi

References

External links 

1979 comedy films
1979 films
Turkish comedy films